Football-Club Le Mont-sur-Lausanne, commonly known as FCL Mont LS, is a Swiss football club based in Le Mont-sur-Lausanne. The club currently plays in the Challenge League.

History
Football Club Le Mont was established on July 1, 1942.

Notable coaches
 Serge Duperret
 Diego Sessolo
 Raphael Tagan

Honours
2008/09: 1. Liga Group 1 Champion
2012/13: 1. Liga Classic Group 1 Champion
2013/14: 1. Liga Promotion Champion

Players

References

External links
Site officiel du club 

Football clubs in Switzerland
Association football clubs established in 1942
1942 establishments in Switzerland